UWI Blackbirds FC, is a Barbados association football club based in Cave Hill, Saint Michael, Barbados. The team is the football division of the UWI Blackbirds athletic program. In 2016, the team won their first Premier Division title.

Honours 
 Barbados Premier Division: 1
2016

References 

Uwi Blackbirds
University and college association football clubs